James Michael Vince (born 14 March 1991) is an English cricketer who is the captain for Hampshire County Cricket Club and plays for the England cricket team. Vince was part of the England squad that won the 2019 Cricket World Cup.  He is a right-handed middle-order batsman who is also a right-arm medium pace bowler. He made his international debut for England in May 2015.

Early life and domestic career
Vince was educated at Warminster School in Wiltshire, where he was a student from 2001 to 2007, before leaving to pursue a career as a professional cricketer. He was also a talented footballer who played for Reading Academy for three years before playing for Trowbridge Town F.C. at 16.

A graduate from Hampshire's cricket academy, Vince signed a one-year deal with the club at the start of 2009. He made his Championship debut on 11 June 2009 against Nottinghamshire County Cricket Club. His batting performances earned him a call up to the England U-19 side for their Test series against Bangladesh.

According to Duncan Fletcher, who acted as a consult for Hampshire and was the former coach of the England team, Vince is reminiscent of former England batsman Michael Vaughan.

Following the retirement of John Crawley during the 2009 season, Vince has been a regular for Hampshire in all forms of the game. He was a member of Hampshire's 2010 Friends Provident t20 winning team which defeated Somerset. Vince scored his maiden first-class century in a county championship against Yorkshire, scoring 180 runs in a 278 run stand with James Adams, which is the county's 4th highest partnership in first-class cricket.

International career
Vince made his One Day International debut for England against Ireland on 8 May 2015, and his Twenty20 International debut against Pakistan on 26 November 2015. He scored 41 in the first game of the T20I series as England won by 14 runs, and then scored 38 in the second as England won again. Vince scored 46 in the final game as the scores finished tied and England won the Super Over. Vince was named man of the series after his contributions in all three games. He played one game in the 2016 World T20, replacing the injured Alex Hales for the match against Afghanistan. Vince scored 22 and England won the match.

In May 2016, Vince was named in the Test squad for Sri Lanka's tour of England, and won his first Test cap in the first Test at Headingley. However, in his first innings, he only scored 9 runs. In the second Test, Vince scored 35 in England's first innings, and was not required to bat in the second as England won by nine wickets. Vince played in the third and final Test of the series, scoring ten in the first innings before being dismissed for a duck in the second innings, as the match ended in a draw. He played in the final ODI match of the series, replacing the injured Alex Hales, and scored 51, helping England to reach 324 and win the match by 122 runs. He scored 16 in the only T20I match between the sides, which England won by eight wickets.

Vince kept his place for the Test series against Pakistan, and made 16 in the first innings of the first Test. He was dismissed for 42 in the second innings as England lost by 75 runs. In the second Test, he made 18 as England made 589/8 in their first innings and won the match by 330 runs. In the third Test, Vince made 39 in England's first innings and followed this up with 42 in their second innings to help England reach 445/6 and secure victory by a margin of 141 runs. Vince struggled in the final Test, making one in the first innings and being dismissed for a duck in the second innings as England lost by 10 wickets.

Vince scored 16 in the first ODI against Bangladesh, as England won by 21 runs. In the second match, he made 5 as England lost and Bangladesh levelled the series at 1-1. Vince made his highest score in the final match of the series, scoring 32 as England chased down Bangladesh's target of 278 to win the series 2–1.

On 21 May 2019, England finalised their squad for the 2019 Cricket World Cup, with Vince named in the 15 man squad. On 29 May 2020, Vince was named in a 55-man group of players to begin training ahead of international fixtures starting in England following the COVID-19 pandemic. On 9 July 2020, Vince was included in England's 24-man squad to start training behind closed doors for the ODI series against Ireland. On 27 July 2020, Vince was named in England's squad for the ODI series. In the second match, Vince took his first wicket in an ODI match, when he dismissed Ireland's captain Andrew Balbirnie.

In July 2021, in the third match against Pakistan, Vince scored his first century in ODI cricket, with 102 runs. England won the game by three wickets, with Vince named the player of the match. In September 2021, Vince was named as one of three travelling reserves in England's squad for the 2021 ICC Men's T20 World Cup.

Franchise cricket
Vince has played for a number of teams in overseas T20 competitions, including the Pakistan Super League, Australian Big Bash League, New Zealand's Super Smash and South Arica's Mzansi Super League.

Pakistan Super League 
In December 2015, Vince was selected by Karachi Kings and on 5 February 2016, he debuted for Karachi against Lahore Qalandars. For the 2019 Pakistan Super League, Vince was signed by Multan Sultans. In December 2019, he was retained by Multan Sultans and was assigned as a team ambassador.

Big Bash League 
In 2016, Vince made his BBL debut for Sydney Thunder. He spent two seasons there before joining local rivals Sydney Sixers for their title winning 2019–20 Big Bash League season. The following season, Vince was again part of Sydney's title-winning side, scoring 95 runs in the final.

The Hundred 
In 2021, he was drafted by Southern Brave for the inaugural season of The Hundred. He was also given the captaincy and under his leadership, Southern Brave won the first title of 'The Hundred' by beating Birmingham Phoenix in the finals. He was the highest run scorer for Southern Brave, scoring 229 runs in 10 matches. In April 2022, he was retained by the Southern Brave for the 2022 season of The Hundred.

Career best performances

References

External links
 

1991 births
Living people
People from Cuckfield
People educated at Warminster School
English cricketers
England Test cricketers
England One Day International cricketers
England Twenty20 International cricketers
Cricketers at the 2019 Cricket World Cup
Wiltshire cricketers
Hampshire cricketers
Hampshire cricket captains
Karachi Kings cricketers
Sydney Thunder cricketers
Auckland cricketers
Sydney Sixers cricketers
Multan Sultans cricketers
Paarl Rocks cricketers
Southern Brave cricketers
North v South cricketers
English footballers
Association footballers not categorized by position
Trowbridge Town F.C. players
Quetta Gladiators cricketers